The use of capital punishment by the United States military is a legal penalty in martial criminal justice. Despite its legality, capital punishment has not been imposed by the U.S. military in over sixty years.

Reinstatement of the military death penalty

The United States Court of Appeals for the Armed Forces ruled in 1983 that the military death penalty was unconstitutional, and after new standards intended to rectify the Armed Forces Court of Appeals' objections, the military death penalty was reinstated by an executive order of President Ronald Reagan the following year.

On 28 July 2008, President George W. Bush approved the execution of Former United States Army Private Ronald A. Gray, who had been convicted in April 1988 of multiple murders and rapes. A month later, Secretary of the Army Pete Geren set an execution date of 10 December 2008 and ordered that Gray be put to death by lethal injection at the Federal Correctional Complex, Terre Haute. The military publicly released Gray's execution date on 20 November 2008. On 26 November, however, Gray was granted a stay of execution by U.S. District Judge Richard Rogers of Kansas. In December 2016, a Kansas federal judge, US District Judge J. Thomas Marten, lifted Gray's stay, moving Gray one step closer to becoming the U.S. military's first death sentence carried out since 1961.

The U.S. Military currently has four inmates (all men) on death row, the most recent being Nidal Hasan, who murdered 13 people and injured 32 others during the 2009 Fort Hood shooting.

Capital crimes
Currently, under the Uniform Code of Military Justice, 14 offenses are punishable by death. Under the following sections of the UCMJ, the death penalty can be imposed in both times of war and peace:

 94 – Mutiny or sedition
 99 – Misbehavior before the enemy
 100 – Subordinate compelling surrender
 101 – Improper use of countersign
 102 – Forcing a safeguard
 103a – Espionage
 104 – Aiding the enemy
 110 – Improper hazarding of vessel
 118 – Murder 
 120 – Rape

Another four provisions of the UCMJ carry a death sentence only if the crime is committed during times of war:

 85 – Desertion
 90 – Assaulting or willfully disobeying a superior commissioned officer
 106 – Lurking as a spy or acting as a spy
 113 – Misbehavior of a sentinel or lookout

Legal process

Capital cases are tried in courts-martial before a panel of at least 12 military members. If the defendant is an enlisted service member, he or she may opt for at least one-third of the panel to also be of enlisted rank. All members of the panel must outrank the accused.  The defendant cannot plead guilty to the charges. A two-thirds majority is enough for conviction, but unanimity is required to issue a death sentence during the penalty phase of the proceeding.

All death sentences are automatically appealed, first to the Court of Criminal Appeals for the military service concerned, then to the United States Court of Appeals for the Armed Forces. The sentence must be personally confirmed by the President of the United States.

Military executions would be conducted under regulations issued on 17 January 2006, and would ordinarily take place at the Special Housing Unit of the United States Disciplinary Barracks (USDB), Fort Leavenworth, Kansas, although alternative locations are possible (such as the Federal Correctional Complex, Terre Haute, Indiana, where federal civilian death-row inmates are housed and executed). Of four convicted servicemen awaiting execution, three are confined at the USDB's Special Housing Unit and one at Camp Lejeune, all of whom have been convicted of murder.

Prior to 1991, the methods of execution approved by Headquarters, Department of the Army were hanging, firing squad (musketry) or electrocution.  Electrocution was added as an option in the 1950s but could only be used at a specific confinement facility designated by Headquarters, and only be performed by a professional civilian executioner.  An  electric chair was installed at the old United States Disciplinary Barracks at Ft. Leavenworth, KS, but was never used. The last military execution occurred in 1961 by hanging. Currently, lethal injection is the only method.

Separately, military commissions may be also established in the field in time of war to expeditiously try and sentence enemy military personnel under the UCMJ for certain offenses. Controversially, the Military Commissions Act of 2009 allows military commissions to try and sentence alien unprivileged enemy belligerent[s] accused of having engaged in or purposefully and materially support[ed] hostilities against the United States or its allies, without the benefit of some UCMJ protections. In a military commission trial, the death penalty may only be imposed in case of a unanimous verdict and sentencing decision.

Previous use

The Creek War
In 1814, Private John Wood was executed by a firing squad for assaulting a superior officer.

American Civil War
Union General William Rosecrans approved the court-martial and hanging of two Confederate officers, Lawrence Orton Williams and Walter Peters, on June 9, 1863 at Franklin, Tennessee, after the duo had disguised themselves as Union officers for the purposes of spying.

On June 20, 1864, Union Army deserter William Johnson was hanged in Petersburg, Virginia.

On March 15, 1865, Confederate captain Marcellus Jerome Clarke was hanged in Kentucky for guerrilla activities.

On March 25, 1865, Confederate captain Robert Cobb Kennedy was hanged in New York City for spying.

In July 1865, four involved in the assassination of President Abraham Lincoln were executed in Washington D.C. by hanging.

On September 6, 1865, two Union soldiers were hanged in Ohio for the murder of a military policeman.

On October 20, 1865, Confederate war criminal Champ Ferguson was hanged in Tennessee on murder charges.

On October 29, 1865, Henry C. Magruder was hanged in Kentucky for guerrilla activities.

On November 10, 1865, Henry Wirz, Confederate commander of Camp Anderson (aka Andersonville POW camp) was tried, convicted and executed by hanging.

First World War 
The United States Army executed 35 soldiers during the First World War by hanging between November 5, 1917 and June 20, 1919, all for offenses relating to murder or rape. 11 of these hangings were performed in France while the remaining 24 were carried out in the continental United States.

1942–1961
The U.S. military executed 160 American servicemen between 1942 and 1961. There have been no military executions since 1961, although the death penalty is still a possible punishment for several crimes under the Uniform Code of Military Justice. Of these executions, 157 were carried out by the United States Army, including members of the United States Army Air Forces prior to September 1947. After becoming independent of the U.S. Army on September 18, 1947, the United States Air Force conducted the three remaining executions, one in 1950 and two in 1954. The United States Navy has not executed any of its own sailors since 1849. 

Of the total, 21 were executed for both rape and murder, 85 for murder, 53 for rape, and one  (Private Eddie Slovik) for desertion.

See also
List of people executed by the United States military
List of death row inmates held by the United States military

Notes

References

Further reading

US Military Executions During WW2

External links
American executions at Shepton Mallet

United States military law
Executed
Unit
Unit
Unit